Philip of Ibelin (died 1304) was constable of Cyprus.

He was son of Baldwin of Ibelin, Seneschal of Cyprus, and Alix, daughter of Walter III of Bethsan and Theodora Comnena-Lathoumnena.

He married c. 1253 to Simone de Montbéliard, daughter of Odo of Montbéliard and had issue:
 Balian (died 1315), titular prince of Galilée; married to Alice of Poitiers, daughter of Hugh III of Cyprus
 Baldwin
 Guy
 Hugues
 Marguerite
 Helvis
 Alice, married to Gautier de Bethsan (died 1315)
 Echive, married firstly to Gautier de Dampierre-sur-Salon and secondly to Hugh of Ibelin lord of Crusoche.
 Marie, married to Guy of Ibelin, Count of Jaffa and Ascalon.

Notes

References

Sources

House of Ibelin